Alexander McGill may refer to:
Alexander McGill (architect) (died 1734), Scottish mason and architect
Alexander T. McGill (1845–1900), New Jersey jurist and politician
Alex McGill from AFL Queensland
 Brigadier General Edward McGill Alexander, South African Military Officer